Kazakh Leading Academy of Architecture and Civil Engineering is a top institution among the higher education institutions of the Republic of Kazakhstan in fields of Architecture, Design, Civil Engineering, Environmental Engineering, Economics and Management in Construction.

Departments and colleges

 Department of Architecture
 Department of Design
 Department of Civil Engineering
 Department of Civil Engineering Technology, Infrastructure and Management
 Department of General Humanitarian Training
 Department of General Natural and Scientific Training
 College of Architecture
 College of Civil Engineering

UIA accreditation 

The most important achievement and visible proof of international significance for the academy was accreditation of the study program of Architecture at KazGASA by UNESCO UIA Charter for Architectural Education. The certificate was awarded on 9 November 2007 and received by the academy in May 2008. It is the first higher education institution in the world accredited on "Architecture" major by UNIESCO UIA commission.

External links 

(KazGASA official website)

Universities and institutes established in the Soviet Union
Universities in Kazakhstan
Education in the Soviet Union
Engineering universities and colleges